Yuasa Phenomenon, named after Japanese physicist and science historian Mitsutomo Yuasa (sometimes referred to as Mintomo Yuasa), suggests that in the modern era, the world center of scientific activity (defined as producing more than 25% of the world's scientific achievements) moves from one country to another about every 80∼100 years.

Analyzed data states the "modern world science centre has shifted from Italy (1504–1610) to the United Kingdom (1660–1750), to France (1760– 1840), to Germany (1875–1920), and to the United States (1920 to the present)."

This phenomenon and its study methodology are an emerging Scientometrics study area. Indicators  are pointing to China rise as a world center of scientific activity. This phenomenon is also described by other names including the Bernal—Yuasa phenomenon. 

Shigeo Minowa links Yuasa's finding to Joseph Ben-David movements of Centers of Learning.

Ben-David's Centers of Learning migration observations are discussed in various works.

References

Social phenomena
History of science
Sociology of science